Cabeza Prieta National Wildlife Refuge (CPNWR) is located in southwestern Arizona in the United States, along  of the Mexico–United States border. It is bordered to the north and to the west by the Barry M. Goldwater Air Force Range, to the south by Mexico's El Pinacate y Gran Desierto de Altar Biosphere Reserve, to the northeast by the town of Ajo, and to the southeast by Organ Pipe Cactus National Monument.

Located within the Yuma Desert, a lower-elevation section of the Sonoran Desert, the refuge was originally established in 1939 to protect desert bighorn sheep. It is home to more than 275 different species of animals and nearly 400 species of plants.

CPNWR is the third largest national wildlife refuge in the lower 48 states. The refuge is administered from a small headquarters building, located in Ajo.

The area is an active corridor for illegal entry and smuggling into the U.S. Since 2017 the skeletal remains of at least forty people have been found here, migrants crossing who died due to lack of water and/or from extreme temperatures. The Trump administration tightened rules against leaving food, water and clothing in such areas even if meant to save lives. Humanitarian aid volunteers were convicted of a misdemeanor in 2019 for doing so, and the incident touched off a debate about moral authority.

Etymology
Spanish for "dark head," the refuge's name comes from the Cabeza Prieta Mountains in the refuge's northwest part.

Wilderness designation
 — amounting to 93% of the total area of CPNWR — was preserved in 1990 as the Cabeza Prieta Wilderness. Author Edward Abbey, a frequent visitor, described the refuge as "the best desert wilderness left in the United States" and is reputedly buried there.

Access

There are only three public-use roads in the refuge: El Camino Del Diablo, Christmas Pass Road and Charlie Bell Road. All of these are unpaved, and they are frequently very difficult to travel because of deep mud and sand, sharp rocks, vegetation, and other obstacles. Four-wheel drive vehicles are required on El Camino Del Diablo and Christmas Pass Road. Charlie Bell Road can be traversed in a 2-wheel drive vehicle, provided the vehicle has a high clearance.

There are no facilities on the refuge, including gasoline, sanitation or potable water. Visitors are advised to carry two spare tires and other spare mechanical parts in case of a breakdown.

Parts of the refuge are sometimes temporarily off-limits to visitors during training exercises on the adjacent Barry M. Goldwater Air Force Range, or because of law enforcement concerns with respect to illegal trafficking of people and drugs from Mexico. Additionally, parts of the refuge are temporarily off-limits to visitors between mid-March and mid-July, during the fawning season for the Sonoran pronghorn (Antilocapra americana sonoriensis), an endangered species endemic to the Sonoran Desert. The purpose of this closure is to minimize disturbance to herds containing fawns, which can result in the loss of fawns.

Fauna

CPNWR is located within the Yuma Desert, a lower-elevation section of the Sonoran Desert. Despite the harshness of the desert environment, the refuge is home to more than 275 different species of animals and nearly 400 species of plants. Many species of birds are permanent residents of CPNWR, while many others migrate through during the spring and fall. Most of the fauna are xerocoles, and they tend to be either nocturnal or crepuscular, most active at dawn and dusk so as to escape the heat.

These fauna include:

 American badger (Taxidea taxus berlandieri)
 Arizona pocket mouse (Perognathus amplus)
 Big brown bat (Eptesicus fuscus pallidus)
 Big free-tailed bat (Nyctinomops macrotis)
 Black-tailed jackrabbit (Lepus californicus)
 Bobcat (Lynx rufus baileyi)
 Broad-billed hummingbird (Cynanthus latirostris)
 Collared peccary (Pecari tajacu)
 Common collared lizard (Crotaphytus collaris)
 Cougar (Puma concolor)
 Coyote (Canis latrans)
 Curve-billed thrasher (Toxostoma curvirostre)
 Desert bighorn sheep (Ovis canadensis nelsoni)
 Desert kangaroo rat (Dipodomys deserti)
 Desert pocket mouse (Chaetodipus penicillatus)
 Elf owl (Micrathene whitneyi)
 Gambel's quail (Callipepla gambelii)
 Giant desert hairy scorpion (Hadrurus arizonensis)
 Gila monster (Heloderma suspectum), a near-threatened species
 Gila woodpecker (Melanerpes uropygialis)
 Golden eagle (Aquila chrysaetos)
 Gray fox (Urocyon cinereoargenteus)
 Greater roadrunner (Geococcyx californianus)
 Harris's antelope squirrel (Ammospermophilus harrisii)
 Kit fox (Vulpes macrotis)
 Lesser long-nosed bat (Leptonycteris yerbabuenae)
 Morafka's desert tortoise (Gopherus morafkai), a vulnerable species
 Desert mule deer (Odocoileus hemionus eremicus)
 Phainopepla (Phainopepla nitens)
 Red-tailed hawk (Buteo jamaicensis)
 Ringtail (Bassariscus astutus yumanensis)
 Round-tailed ground squirrel (Xerospermophilus tereticaudus)
 Sonoran Desert centipede (Scolopendra polymorpha)
 Sonoran Desert sidewinder (Crotalus cerastes cercobombus)
 Sonoran pronghorn (Antilocapra americana sonoriensis), an endangered species
 Vermilion flycatcher (Pyrocephalus rubinus)
 Western pipistrelle (Pipistrellus hesperus)
 Western spotted skunk (Spilogale gracilis leucoparia)

History

In 1936, the Arizona boy scouts mounted a statewide campaign to save the desert bighorn sheep, leading to the creation of CPNWR. The Scouts first became interested in the sheep through the efforts of Major Frederick Russell Burnham, the noted conservationist who has been called the "Father of Scouting". Burnham observed that fewer than 150 of these sheep still lived in the Arizona mountains. He called George F. Miller, then scout executive of the boy scout council headquartered in Phoenix, with a plan to conserve them.

Several other prominent Arizonans joined the movement and a Save the Bighorns poster contest was started in schools throughout the state. The contest-winning bighorn emblem was made up into neckerchief slides for the 10,000 Boy Scouts, and talks and dramatizations were given at school assemblies and on radio. The National Wildlife Federation, the Izaak Walton League, and the National Audubon Society also joined the effort.

A brick and stone monument was erected on a hill near Tule Well, and Major Burnham delivered the dedication speech opening CPNWR in 1941.

The desert bighorn sheep is now the official mascot for the Arizona Boy Scouts and the number of sheep in these parks have increased substantially. In 1989, in celebration of the 50th anniversary of this refuge, the stone monument on the site was re-dedicated to the Arizona Boy Scouts and Major Burnham.

Gallery

See also
 Buenos Aires National Wildlife Refuge
 Category: Fauna of the Sonoran Desert
 Category: Protected areas of the Sonoran Desert
 Gran Desierto de Altar
 List of flora of the Sonoran Desert Region by common name
 Sierra Pinta
 Tule Desert (Arizona)
El Camino del Diablo

Notes

Further reading
 Border Patrol: Along the Devil's Highway
 Cabeza Prieta National Wildlife Refuge
 Cabeza Prieta National Wildlife Refuge - Arizona
 Vehicle Trails Associated with Illegal Border Activities on Cabeza Prieta National Wildlife Refuge – July 2011

External links

 Cabeza Prieta National Wildlife Refuge, official United States Fish and Wildlife Service website
 Cabeza Prieta Natural History Association
  (produced by the National Conservation Training Center of the United States Fish and Wildlife Service)

National Wildlife Refuges in Arizona
Sonoran Desert
Yuma Desert
Gran Desierto de Altar
Protected areas of the Sonoran Desert
Protected areas of Pima County, Arizona
Protected areas of Yuma County, Arizona
Civilian Conservation Corps in Arizona
Protected areas established in 1939
1939 establishments in Arizona